Kenny Endo (born April 2, 1953) is an American musician and taiko master. He is the leader of several taiko ensembles and regularly tours, performing traditional and contemporary taiko music. Endo is also the first non-Japanese national to receive a natori in the field of hogaku hayashi, Japanese classical drumming. Today Endo composes his own music and plays taiko professionally as a solo artist, with his ensembles, and in collaboration with other artists.

Early life
Kenny Endo was born on April 2, 1953 in Los Angeles, California to an Issei (first generation) father and Nisei (second generation) mother Japanese American parents.   Endo was raised in Los Angeles with his brother and three sisters, and while he was exposed to some Japanese culture as a child, he grew up as an American. From an early age, he loved drums and taiko, and started playing drums at nine years of age. Endo played in the school orchestra and band, and on his own drum set throughout middle and high school.

Endo began college at the University of California, Santa Cruz; he would eventually major in Political Science and minor in Ethnomusicology at UCLA.  In 1973, while still in college, he had the opportunity to do a six-month field study on a Native American reservation in Arizona, which had served as Poston War Relocation Center, the largest Japanese-American internment camp during WWII.  The experience was a big turning point in his life that made him want to learn more about his own culture. Around the same time, in 1973, Kenny had his first experience with kumidaiko (ensemble drumming) when he saw San Francisco Taiko Dojo perform in San Jose. The performance made him realize that taiko was something he wanted to do in life. After finishing his time on the Native American reservation, Endo returned to Los Angeles and in 1975 was accepted into Kinnara Taiko, the seminal taiko group in Los Angeles, which is based in the Senshin Buddhist Temple.

Career 
However, at the time Kinnara Taiko was only playing during the Obon festival season, and Endo wanted more practice. He consequently spent a summer studying with Seiichi Tanaka and the San Francisco Taiko Dojo (SFTD), and, after finishing school at the University of California, Los Angeles in 1976, he moved to San Francisco to continue working with SFTD.  While there, he studied taiko by day and worked as a jazz musician by night. Up until this point in his life, Endo had been heavily influenced by his love of all music, especially rock and jazz. In 1979, he had to make the choice of whether to continue studying taiko and move to Japan, or to pursue jazz seriously and move to New York City.  He chose taiko, which combined his interest in drums and music and his desire to get back to his cultural roots, and, in 1980, Endo moved to Japan to study the roots of the art form. The trip, which was originally supposed to last one year, took a total of ten.

While in Japan Endo studied and mastered three types of Japanese drumming:  kumi-daiko (group drumming), hogaku hayashi (classical drumming), and matsuri bayashi (festival music). He started by playing in a group called O Suwa Daiko for six months before moving to Tokyo at the end of 1980. While in Tokyo, he studied with Sukeroku Taiko, and when Sukeroku Taiko split into two groups in 1982, Endo joined Oedo Sukeroku Taiko, with whom he stayed until 1987.   Endo also began to do freelance work and duets in 1983, and by 1987 he had gone solo, continuing his studies and composing his own taiko music. Also while in Japan, Endo received a natori (stage name) in hogaku hayashi, Japanese classical drumming.  Natori literally means “to take on a name,” and it functions as both a name to perform under and a license to teach. Endo was the first ever foreigner to receive the high honor of a natori in the field of hogaku hayashi. His stage name is Mochizuki Tajiro.

After spending ten years in Japan, Endo applied for and was granted a scholarship through the East-West Center at the University of Hawaii (UH).  In 1990, he moved to Honolulu, Hawaii with his wife, Chizuko Endo, and two sons, to pursue graduate studies in Ethnomusicology at UH. While there, the university asked him to teach, and Endo began teaching taiko classes through the non-credit program at UH. The program quickly grew, and soon was too large of a capacity for UH to handle.  In 1994, Kenny and Chizuko moved the classes to the chapel on the site of Kapiolani Community College and started the Taiko Center of the Pacific (TCP), which offers classes to people of all ages and abilities.

Music 
Currently Endo has two main performing groups: The Kenny Endo Taiko Ensemble (KETE) and the Kenny Endo Contemporary Ensemble.  The Kenny Endo Taiko Ensemble was started around 1991, and today has 3 groups: one based in Japan, one in Hawaii, and one on the mainland US.  KETE plays mainly kumidaiko, and splits its time between performing pieces by other composers, pieces composed by Endo, and pieces composed by group members. The Contemporary Ensemble “performs original works combining taiko with melodic and other instruments such as koto,”  and serves as Endo’s experimental group.  Beyond just being a taiko artist, Kenny Endo is influenced by music from around the world, and these influences come out in his compositions.  Kenny Endo has also done a lot of work as a soloist, and is known around the world for his taiko drumming.

Today Endo would like to continue the musical and cultural innovation he has started.  His time is split between performing, composing, and teaching, and his goal is to pass on his learnings to the future generations through his school. In the future, Endo plans to expand his performances and collaborations with other artists.

Collaborations and awards
Kenny Endo has worked with numerous artists on many distinguished projects.
His works include, but are not limited to, opening for The Who, performing a duet with singer Bobby McFerrin, performing for Michael Jackson and Prince, as well as Princess Diana and Prince Charles. He has performed with the Hong Kong Philharmonic Orchestra, the Honolulu Symphony, and the Tokyo Symphony.  Endo has recorded music for 3 films: Kayo Hatta’s “Picture Bride,” Francis Ford Coppola’s “Apocalypse Now,” and James Cameron’s “Avatar.” He was also featured in the PBS special, “The Spirit of Taiko” (2006).

Endo has received commissions to compose and tour new music from the American Composers Forum, the McKnight Foundation, The Children's Theatre Company, the Rockefeller Foundation (MAPP), the Japan Foundation, Continental Harmony, the Freeman Foundation, Hawai`i State Foundation on Culture and the Arts, the Japanese American Cultural and Community Center, Stanford Lively Arts, and the Honolulu Mayor’s Office of Culture and the Arts.

Discography
Endo has recorded seven CDs of original taiko compositions:
Eternal Energy (1994): Featuring the Kenny Endo Taiko Ensemble of Tokyo
Hibiki (1998): Featuring the Kenny Endo Taiko Ensemble of Tokyo
Jugoya (2000): Featuring the Kenny Endo Taiko Ensembles of Tokyo and Honolulu
Essence (2001): Featuring Kenny Endo, Masayuki Koga, Michiyo Koga
On The Way [Michi Yuki] (2007): Featuring Joji Hirota, John Kaizan Neptune, and Kenny Endo
Rhythm Summit: featuring Noel Okimoto, Dean Taba, and Kenny Endo
Honua (earth): featuring Derek Nakamoto and Kenny Endo

References

External links
  http://www.taikoarts.com/about.html
  http://www.kennyendo.com/programs/kece

1953 births
Living people
Musicians from Los Angeles
American musicians of Japanese descent
Taiko players